No Pocky for Kitty is the second studio album by American indie rock band Superchunk, released in 1991. Pocky is a popular Japanese snack food.

Production
The album was recorded April 21–23, 1991, at the Chicago Recording Company by Steve Albini. It was released on Matador Records in 1991, and reissued by Merge Records in 1999.

Albini is not credited in the liner notes, which read "Produced with eyes closed by Laura, who sat in the right chair." The reference is to Laura Ballance, the group's bassist.

Critical reception
Trouser Press praised the album's "indelible hooks" and Mac McCaughan’s "opaque yet curiously coercive lyric expression." Paste wrote that the album "captures Superchunk at the ideal cross-section of youthful ebullience and clearheaded experience."

Track listing
 "Skip Steps 1 & 3" – 3:07
 "Seed Toss" – 2:59
 "Cast Iron" – 3:48
 "Tower" – 2:47
 "Punch Me Harder" – 2:13
 "Sprung a Leak" – 3:01
 "30 Xtra" – 2:31
 "Tie a Rope to the Back of the Bus" – 2:54
 "Press" – 2:08
 "Sidewalk" – 3:02
 "Creek" – 1:41
 "Throwing Things" – 3:26

B-sides include "Fishing", "Cool", "The Breadman", "It's So Hard to Fall in Love", "Brand New Love", and "I Believe in Fate".

References

External links

1991 albums
Superchunk albums
Matador Records albums
Albums produced by Steve Albini